El trueno entre las hojas meaning ("Thunder Among the Leaves") may refer to:

El Trueno entre las hojas (book), a 1953 collection of short stories by Augusto Roa Bastos
Thunder Among the Leaves, a 1958 Argentine drama film directed by Armando Bó